John Smyth (c. 1554 – c. 28 August 1612) was an English Anglican, Baptist, then Mennonite minister and a defender of the principle of religious liberty.

Early life
Smyth is thought to have been the son of John Smyth, a yeoman of Sturton-le-Steeple, Nottinghamshire. He was educated locally at the grammar school in Gainsborough and in Christ's College, Cambridge, where he became a Fellow in 1594. Smyth was ordained as an Anglican priest in 1594 in England.

Ministry
He preached in the city of Lincoln in 1600 to 1602.

In 1607, he broke with the Church of England and left for Holland where he, Thomas Helwys and his small congregation began to study the Bible ardently. He briefly returned to England. In the beginning, Smyth was closely aligned with his Anglican heritage. As time passed, his views evolved.  Smyth's education at Cambridge included the "trivium" and "quadrivium" which included a heavy emphasis upon Aristotelian logic and metaphysics.  Smyth's evolving ecclesiology was due to his applying biblical truth about the truth into numerous logical syllogisms.

It was in Holland that Smyth discovered Anabaptist theology and retained its principles, notably on believer's baptism by immersion, opposed to infant baptism and the memorial of the last Supper, opposed to consubstantiation and transubstantiation.

In 1608, he published The Differences of the Churches, in which he explained the characteristics of a biblical church:

First, Smyth insisted that true worship comes from the heart and that there should be no books other than the Bible in worship. Praying, singing and preaching should be spontaneous only. He did not read the Bible translation during worship, preferring the original language version.

Second, Smyth introduced a twofold church leadership, that of pastor and deacon and said that a church could have several pastors.

Third, the financial support of the church should come only from the members and not from the government, because that would mean giving them control over the church.

In 1609, Smyth, and Thomas Helwys, along with a group in Holland, came to believe in believer's baptism (thereby rejecting infant baptism) and they came together to form one of the earliest Baptist churches. He was utterly convinced that believer's baptism and a free church gathered by covenant were foundational to the church.

Having been baptized as infants, like the Anabaptists of the Radical Reformation they came to believe they would need to be re-baptized. Since there was no other minister to administer baptism, Smyth baptized himself in 1609 (for which reason he was called "the Se-baptist," from the Latin word se '[one]self') and then with Thomas Helwys proceeded to baptize the Church.

John Clifford as cited in the General Baptist Magazine, London, July 1879, vol. 81) records that "[I]n 1606 on March 24. . .this night at midnight elder John Morton baptized John Smyth, vicar of Gainsborough, in the River Don. It was so dark we were obliged to have torch lights. Elder Brewster prayed, Mister Smith made a good confession; walked to Epworth in his cold clothes, but received no harm. The distance was over two miles. All of our friends were present. To the triune God be praise." This account was later revealed to have been a forgery connected with the rebuilding of the Baptist Church at Crowle, where the church (now closed) still bears a plaque falsely claiming to have been founded in 1599.
It has been suggested by W. T. Whitley that Smyth may have coined such well-known theological terms as Pedobaptist.

In February 1610, Smyth and other church members wrote a letter to a Mennonite community in Waterland to join their movement. This resulted in his excommunication from the church by Thomas Helwys. Smyth and part of the church joined a Mennonite church, while Helwys and part of the church returned to England to found the first permanent Baptist church there, in 1612. The churches that descended from Helwys were of the General Baptist persuasion. Baptist historian Tom J. Nettles argues that Helwys and his group "earned the name General Baptists" because they "claimed that Christ died for all men rather than for the elect only". This is seen as a step away from fully Calvinist commitments.

Death
He died from dysentery on 28 August 1612 in Amsterdam.

See also

 Baptists
 Believer's baptism
 Baptist offices

References

Further reading
 Hathi Trust. In two volumes.

1550s births
1612 deaths
Year of birth uncertain
16th-century English Anglican priests
17th-century English Baptist ministers
English separatists
People from Lincolnshire
English Baptist theologians
16th-century English theologians
17th-century English theologians
People educated at Queen Elizabeth's High School